Gramenca is a genus of the spider family Salticidae (jumping spiders). Its single described species, Gramenca prima, is found in Guinea.

Name
The genus name is derived from Latin gramen "grass", which is the habitat of G. prima. The specific name prima means first, for this is the first described Gramenca species.

Appearance
The male is not yet known.

References

Fauna of Guinea
Monotypic Salticidae genera
Salticidae
Spiders of Africa
Taxa named by Wanda Wesołowska